Hålogaland Teater is a regional theatre serving the region of Nord-Norge, the northernmost of Norway. When established in 1971, it was the first regional theatre in Norway, and the first professional theatre in Nord-Norge. Many of its productions are staged in the regional Norwegian dialects. Although based in Tromsø in the Arctic Circle, where it occupies a modern purpose-built building, the theatre also tours the surrounding rural areas. The varied schedule includes a mixture of genres, contemporary and classic drama, and musical and children's theatre.

History
Lars Berg (1901–1969) a local  based novelist, short story writer and playwright, had campaigned for a regional theatre since the 1940s. He intended to bring drama in local dialects into the far flung communities of the region. His vision was realised when the theatre began work, on 15 August 1971. While the first production, The Threepenny Opera (Die Dreigroschenoper) by German  composers  Bertolt Brecht  (1898–1956) and Kurt Weill (1900–1950), received positive critical reviews, only 16 people attended the premiere. At the time, the theatre consisted of only 8 actors and two technicians, and lacked a permanent home.

Early productions tended to highlight political and social issues, but this radical edge faded as the theatre diversified. Originally it operated across all three counties in the region, but since the foundation of the Nordland Teater, it has focused mainly on Troms and Finnmark.

Its first permanent theatre space was found in 1984, at the new arts centre (Kulturhuset) in Tromsø. In 1986 actor and director Bernhard Ramstad got the job as theater manager.

In 2005, it moved into a purpose-built theatre building, officially opened by Queen Sonja of Norway on November 5. This building includes three theatres, as well as dressing rooms, workshops and public spaces, a vast improvement on previous homes, which have included a disused margarine factory. As of 2005, the theatre has around 50 employees, including technical, administrative and artistic workers, and a mixture of young and established actors.

One of the theater's biggest successes was a full-length piece about the northern Norwegian village hero Oluf Rallkattli written and portrayed by Arthur Arntzen. This became the theater's greatest audience success. Arntzen repeated the success of a new performance in 1996. The show was played for a whole year and ended at Moss  in April 1997. The theater was selected as the millennium site for Troms county.

See also

 List of Norwegian theatres
 Hålogaland
 Culture of Norway

References

Other sources
Jens Harald Eilertsen  (2004) ''Teater utenfor folkeskikken nordnorsk teaterhistorie fra istid til 1971 (Orkana Forlag AS: Stamsund)

External links
 Photographs of the new building, provided by the theatre's website (accessed 12 March 2006):     
 Homepage of the theatre (in Norwegian, accessed 12 March 2006)
 Aurora, Ice and Ibsen, from the theatre's website (accessed 12 March 2006)

Theatres in Norway
Buildings and structures in Tromsø
Culture in Troms
Culture in Finnmark
1971 establishments in Norway
Millennium sites